Abu Taher Mujahid Abdullah (Rony) is a Bengali Indian politician from the state of West Bengal. He was a member of the West Bengal Legislative Assembly (2011 by election – 2016). He became runner-up in the 2016 Vidhan Sabha Election from Basirhat Uttar Assembly.

References

Trinamool Congress politicians from West Bengal
Living people
West Bengal MLAs 2011–2016
People from North 24 Parganas district
Year of birth missing (living people)
People from Basirhat